Miguel Reis Antunes Frasquilho is a Portuguese economist, politician, and executive, currently serving as Chairman of the Board of TAP Air Portugal, Portugal's flag carrier airline. He also serves on the Olympic Committee of Portugal.

A member of the Social Democratic Party (PSD), Frasquilho served in the Portuguese Parliament for 13 years, where he was Vice-President of the PSD Parliamentary Group. He also served as Secretary of State of the Treasury and Finances from 2002 to 2003, in José Manuel Barroso's short-lived government prior to becoming president of the EU Commission. He was the President and CEO of AICEP Portugal Global, the Portuguese Government's Trade & Investment Agency, from 2014 to 2017.

Early life
Miguel Jorge Reis Antunes Frasquilho was born on 12 November 1965, in Setúbal, Portugal, to Fernando José Antunes Frasquilho, an official in the merchant navy, and Maria Susete Reis Antunes Frasquilho, a professor. His uncle was Manuel Antunes Frasquilho, former president of the Port of Lisbon and the Lisbon Metro, and his cousin is Portuguese-American executive Helder Fragueiro Antunes.

He attained a bachelor in economics from the Lisbon School of Business & Economics of the Catholic University of Portugal in 1988 and a masters in economic theory, from the Nova School of Business and Economics of the Universidade Nova de Lisboa, in 1997. He taught various disciplines in Economy and Quantitative Method in the Católica Lisbon School of Business & Economics and Nova School of Business and Economics.

Politics

Frasquilho started his political career as Advisor to the State Secretary of Trade from 1993 to 1995 in the XII Government. In 1996 he joined Banco Espírito Santo, where he served as Coordinating Director of Espírito Santo Research.

He is a member of the Social Democratic Party and was first elected to Portuguese Parliament in 2002, in the IX Legislature of the Third Portuguese Republic (2002-2005). He held his position as a deputy in Parliament in the following X (2005-2009), XI (2009-2011), and XII (2011-2015) Legislatures.

Frasquilho entered the XV Constitutional Government, as Secretary of State for Treasury and Finance, from 2002-2003.

He returned to the Portuguese Parliament where he was President of the Parliamentary Commission for Public Works, Transport and Communications between March 2005 and October 2008.

Frasquilho was also part of the Commission for Corporate Income Tax reform, that took place between January and July 2013.

Career
Frasquilho has served as Chairman of the Board of João Mata, Lda, a Portuguese multinational insurance consultancy and brokerage, since 2017. He is also a lecturer at the Catholic University of Portugal.

AICEP
In April 2014, Frasquilho was chosen to be President of AICEP, the Portuguese Government's Trade & Investment Agency.

TAP Portugal
In March 2017, Frasquilho was appointed to be Chairman of the Board of TAP Portugal, Portugal's flag carrier airline.

Published works
Sole authorship:
 “As Raizes do Mal, a Troika e o Futuro” (2013).
Co-authorship:
 Portugal Agora (2017)
 Portugal e o Futuro – Homenagem a Ernâni Lopes (2011)
 As Farpas da Quarta (2009)
 4R – Quarta República (2007)
 Produtividade e Crescimento em Portugal (2002)
 Portugal Europeu? (2001)

References

External links

Members of the Assembly of the Republic (Portugal)
Social Democratic Party (Portugal) politicians
People from Lisbon
1965 births
Living people